Tom Abraham Rapoport (born June 17, 1947) is a German-American cell biologist who studies protein transport in cells. Currently, he is a professor at Harvard Medical School and a Howard Hughes Medical Institute investigator. Born in Cincinnati, OH, he grew up in the German Democratic Republic. In 1995 he accepted an offer to become a professor at Harvard Medical School, Boston. In 1997 he became an investigator of the Howard Hughes Medical Institute. He is a member of the American and German National Academies of Science.

Biography
Rapoport was born in Cincinnati in 1947. His parents, Samuel Mitja Rapoport and Ingeborg Rapoport, had fled the Nazis, and when he was three years old, they fled the United States in 1950 due to being investigated for un-American activities. After a brief stay in Vienna, they finally settled in Berlin in the German Democratic Republic in 1952, where his father became a Professor for Biochemistry and director of the Institute of Physiological Chemistry of the Humboldt-University, and his mother became a Professor for neonatology at the Charite Hospital. His brother is mathematician Michael Rapoport. Tom A. Rapoport received his PhD on mathematical modeling of the kinetics of inorganic pyrophosphatase in 1972 from Humboldt University. He worked in the lab of Peter Heitmann, and his father, Samuel Mitja Rapoport, was head of the Institute of Physiological Chemistry. At Humboldt he collaborated with Reinhart Heinrich on the mathematical modeling of glycolysis in red blood cells, leading to the establishment of metabolic control theory on which they submitted a joint 'habilitation' thesis. At the same time he worked with Sinaida Rosenthal, a former student of his father, on cloning the insulin gene from carp.

In 1979 he moved to the Zentralinstitut für Molekularbiologie der Akademie der Wissenschaften der DDR, later called the Max Delbrück Center for Molecular Medicine, where he became a professor in 1985. He moved to the United States, the country his parents fled from in 1950, in 1995. He has been a professor at the Harvard Medical School since 1995, and an HHMI investigator since 1997.

He studies several aspects of cellular secretion, including the mechanisms by which newly synthesized proteins are translocated from the cytosol to the lumen of the endoplasmic reticulum by the Sec61 complex (also known as the translocon), how misfolded secretory proteins are degraded by endoplasmic reticulum associated protein degradation (also known as ERAD), and how reticulons and related proteins regulate the morphology of the endoplasmic reticulum.

Selected research articles

Awards
2004 Awarded Otto Warburg Medal of the German Society for Biochemistry and Molecular Biology 
2005 Awarded Max Delbrück Medal of the Max Delbrück Center for Molecular Medicine.
2007 Sir Hans Krebs Medal
2011 Awarded the Schleiden Medal from the Leopoldina

References

External links
Profile at Harvard Medical School
Profile at the HHMI
Rapoport laboratory website
 

1947 births
Living people
American people of German-Jewish descent
20th-century German biologists
Cell biologists
Humboldt University of Berlin alumni
Harvard Medical School faculty
Members of the United States National Academy of Sciences
Howard Hughes Medical Investigators
Members of the German Academy of Sciences at Berlin
Schleiden Medal recipients
East German scientists
21st-century American biologists
Scientists from Cincinnati